Fuk'anggan (Manchu:, Möllendorff: fuk'anggan; ; 1748–1796), courtesy name Yaolin, was a Manchu noble and general of the Qing Dynasty. He was from the Fuca clan and the Bordered Yellow Banner of the Eight Banners.

Fuk'anggan's father, Fuheng, brother of the Empress Xiaoxianchun, served as a grand minister of state during the middle years of the reign of the Qianlong Emperor. Fuk'anggan held various offices throughout Qianlong's reign, including Governor-General, Viceroy of Liangjiang and Viceroy of Liangguang.

The Salar Jahriyya Sufi revolt in Gansu was put down by Fuk'anggan along with Agui and Li Shiyao in 1784, while Heshen was recalled for his failure during the revolt.

In 1787, 300,000 people took part in the Lin Shuangwen rebellion in Taiwan against the Qing government. Fuk'anggan commanded 20,000 troops and suppressed the rebellion. In 1790, the Nepalese Gurkha army invaded Tibet and the 8th Dalai Lama, Jamphel Gyatso, escaped from Lhasa and appealed to the Qing government for help. The Qianlong Emperor appointed Fuk'anggan as commander-in-chief of the Tibetan campaign and Fuk'anggan attacked until they reach Nuwakot and being keen to protect their troops went for negotiation in the Sino-Nepalese War.

Titles
 1776–1784: Viscount Jiayong of the Third Rank
 1784–1787: Marquiss Jiayong of the First Rank
 1787–1793: Duke Jiayong of the First Rank
 1793–1796: Duke Zhongrui Jiayong
 Posthumous title: Prince Jiayong of the Second Rank
 Posthumous name: Wenxiang

In fiction and popular culture
 As novel character in Jin Yong's The Book and the Sword and The Young Flying Fox 
 Portrayed by Wang Yi Zhe in Yanxi Palace 2 : Princess Adventures (2019)
 Portrayed by Ye Xiang Ming in Side Story of Volant Fox (2022)

References

Citations

Sources 

 Anonymous (1795).  (the Collected Biography of Hailanca) 
 Draft History of Qing

External links 
 

1753 births
1796 deaths
Generals from Beijing
Grand Councillors of the Qing dynasty
Grand Secretaries of the Qing dynasty
Assistant Grand Secretaries
Manchu Bordered Yellow Bannermen
Manchu politicians
Political office-holders in Fujian
Political office-holders in Gansu
Political office-holders in Guangdong
Political office-holders in Jilin
Political office-holders in Liaoning
Political office-holders in Sichuan
Political office-holders in Yunnan
Qing dynasty generals
Qing dynasty politicians from Beijing
Qianlong Emperor
Viceroys of Min-Zhe
Viceroys of Shaan-Gan
Viceroys of Sichuan
Viceroys of Yun-Gui
Viceroys of Liangguang